Intensity is an album by organist Charles Earland which was recorded in 1972 and released on the Prestige label.

Reception

Allmusic awarded the album 4 stars stating "Even if the performances on Intensity weren't excellent, this Charles Earland session would be required listening for jazz historians because it marked the last recorded documentation of Lee Morgan. Only two days after Intensity was recorded at Rudy Van Gelder's famous New Jersey studio on February 17, 1972, the influential trumpeter was shot and killed by a girlfriend at the age of 33. Refusing to confine himself to hard bop, Morgan was exploring soul-jazz and fusion during the last years of his life -- and his enthusiasm for soul-jazz is hard to miss".

Track listing 
All compositions by Charles Earland except as indicated
 "Happy 'Cause I'm Goin' Home" (Robert Lamm) - 11:15     
 "Will You Still Love Me Tomorrow" (Gerry Goffin, Carole King) - 6:55     
 "'Cause I Love Her" - 9:38     
 "Morgan" - 10:25     
 "Lowdown" (Peter Cetera, Danny Seraphine) - 8:20 Bonus track on CD reissue     
 "Speedball" (Lee Morgan) - 5:19 Bonus track on CD reissue

Personnel 
Charles Earland - organ
Jon Faddis, Virgil Jones, Lee Morgan, Victor Paz - trumpet, flugelhorn
Clifford Adams (on track 1 only), Dick Griffin, Jack Jeffers - trombone 
Hubert Laws - flute (and on track 4 only, piccolo flute)
Billy Harper - tenor saxophone (on track 4 only)
William Thorpe - baritone saxophone (on track 4 only)
Maynard Parker (on track 4 only), John Fourie, Greg Millar - guitar
Billy Cobham - drums 
Sonny Morgan - congas

References 

Charles Earland albums
1972 albums
Prestige Records albums
Albums recorded at Van Gelder Studio